Hugh James Fitzpatrick (19 July 1872 – 1 January 1925) was an Australian rules footballer who played with Essendon in the Victorian Football League (VFL).

Notes

External links 
		

1872 births
1925 deaths
Australian rules footballers from Geelong
Essendon Football Club players
North Fremantle Football Club players